The Bell Sports Complex is a multipurpose sports facility located in Brossard, Quebec, Canada. Situated near Quebec Autoroute 10 and the Quartier Dix30 lifestyle center, the primary function of the Bell Sports Complex is to serve as the official practice facility of the Montreal Canadiens National Hockey League team. It opened on December 12, 2008, and features two ice hockey rinks and one indoor soccer pitch.

Soccer

See also
Bell Centre

References

External links
Official website
Bell Centre
Montreal Canadiens

Indoor ice hockey venues in Quebec
Indoor arenas in Quebec
Sports venues completed in 2008
Buildings and structures in Brossard
Tourist attractions in Montérégie
National Hockey League practice facilities